Herbert Wieger (born 7 February 1972) is an Austrian former professional association football player. He played as a striker.

References

1972 births
Living people
Austrian footballers
Association football forwards
Austrian Football Bundesliga players
2. Liga (Austria) players
First Vienna FC players
Grazer AK players
FC Kärnten players
FC Admira Wacker Mödling players
Kapfenberger SV players